Terumi (written: , ,  or  in hiragana) is a unisex Japanese given name. Notable people with the name include:

, Japanese long-distance runner
, Japanese handball player
, Japanese women's footballer
, Japanese actress
, Japanese cyclist

Male
, Japanese anti-nuclear and anti-war activist

Fictional characters
Afuro Terumi, a fictional character from the Inazuma Eleven franchise 
Yuuki Terumi, a fictional character from the game BlazBlue: Chronophantasma

Japanese unisex given names